Tonshayevsky District is an administrative district (raion), one of the forty in Nizhny Novgorod Oblast, Russia. Municipally, it is incorporated as Tonshayevsky Municipal District. It is located in the northeast of the oblast. Its administrative center is the urban locality (a work settlement) of Tonshayevo. Population: 20,219 (2010 Census);  The population of Tonshayevo accounts for 22.6% of the district's total population.

History
The district was established in 1929.

Transportation
The Altsevo peat narrow gauge railway is located in the work settlement of Pizhma, closed in 2015.
The Pizhemskaya narrow gauge railway is located in the work settlement of Pizhma.

References

Notes

Sources
 
 

Districts of Nizhny Novgorod Oblast
States and territories established in 1929